Tess Rafferty is an American writer, comedian, and actress.  The author of the 2012 culinary memoir, Recipes for Disaster, Rafferty has written for television shows including @midnight, and networks such as MTV and Comedy Central.  From 2005 until 2012, she was the supervising producer for The Soup and the show's only female writer. She frequently appeared on The Soup as herself, Posh Spice, a Succubus, a “guidette” from Jersey Shore and The Dancing Maxi Pad.

Biography
Tess Rafferty grew up in Wilmington, Delaware.  She attended Emerson College, and as a student performed in Boston comedy clubs.  She studied acting and art history and earned her degree in 1997. Following her graduation she moved to Los Angeles, where she began writing for television and performed as a stand up comedian and storyteller.

In 2012, her culinary memoir, Recipes for Disaster, was released by St. Martin's Press. In a review of the book, Kirkus Reviews wrote: "What distinguishes this author from others is (Rafferty's) insatiable appetite for wine, her indomitable spirit in the face of catastrophe, her resolute desire to please everyone and her offbeat sense of humor."

In November 2016, two days after the presidential election, Rafferty wrote a "hard hitting" statement about the election of Donald Trump. The piece was filmed by director Steve Cohen and edited by Aaron Barrocas.  An edited version of Rafferty's performance was shared by Occupy Democrats on November 18; in five days, it received nearly 22 million views.

References

External links
Official site
What Everyone Who Voted for Trump Needs to Hear 
Tess Rafferty on Twitter
Regrets Only (Podcast) 

Year of birth missing (living people)
Living people
21st-century American comedians
American women writers
Emerson College alumni
21st-century American women